The Anne Frank Human Rights Memorial is a  cenotaph complex and educational park in Boise, Idaho near the Boise Public Library and the Greenbelt, the centerpiece of which is a statue of Anne Frank; it is jointly maintained by the Wassmuth Center for Human Rights and the Boise Department of Parks and Recreation, and is the only human rights memorial in the U.S. Designed by Idaho Falls architect Kurt Karst, a sapling of the Anne Frank Tree and quotations from some sixty notables and unknowns (including poets, activists, politicians and diplomats, those who survived the Holocaust, and those who did not) are prominent installations. It also features one of the few installations where the full text of the Universal Declaration of Human Rights is on permanent public display. The park has been recognized and accepted by the International Coalition of Sites of Conscience. It was thoroughly renovated in September 2018, with an outdoor classroom and a new sculpture, "The Spiral of Injustice."

Museum researcher Brigitte Sion has written that in seeking to use Anne Frank as a symbol for various universal and parochial issues, the memorial offers a sanitized version of Anne Frank that denies the reality of her history. Sion writes "Nothing in the Boise memorial's mission statement, its official literature, or at the site itself directly identifies Anne Frank as a Jewish victim of the Holocaust or explains the reason for her hiding, let alone for her arrest, deportation, and death in a Nazi concentration camp".

The site not only serves as a convenient staging area for rallies, marches, and protests (and more generally as a contemplative spot), it is where the Boise Police Department takes their newly commissioned officers before field training.

Vandalism
In early May 2017 the plaque featuring the beginning of the complete Universal Declaration of Human Rights was vandalized with antisemitic graffiti in red marker; more generally two different areas of the site were also defaced over the next few days with racist slurs against black people and Jews causing $20,000 in damage, due in part to the botched initial attempts at repair. The vandalism, the first since the memorial's dedication in 2002, is being investigated as a potential hate crime, and numerous donations for repair have poured in.

In December 2020, the memorial was defamed with pieces of paper reading "we are everywhere" and depiction of a swastika. This prompted Mayor Lauren McLean to say, "Bad actors who use racist and violent rhetoric are not welcome in this community."

Gallery

See also
Ten stages of genocide
List of parks in Boise

Notes

Anne Frank
Articles containing video clips
Boise, Idaho
Antisemitic attacks and incidents in the United States
Works about human rights
Jews and Judaism in Idaho
Monuments and memorials in Idaho
Sculptures in Idaho
Holocaust memorials
Vandalized works of art in Idaho
Outdoor sculptures in Idaho
2002 establishments in Idaho
Public art in Idaho